The 2002 United States Senate election in Delaware was held on November 5, 2002. Incumbent Democratic U.S. Senator Joe Biden won re-election to a sixth term, defeating Raymond Clatworthy in a rematch. This is the last Senate election that Biden decreased his percentage of the votes since the previous election and the only time Biden lost  Kent County in his seven elections to the Senate. With this election, Biden became the first senator in Delaware to win six terms and became the state's longest-serving senator.

Candidates 
 Joe Biden (D), incumbent Delaware senator running for a sixth consecutive term

 Raymond Clatworthy (R), businessman and nominee for the U.S. Senate in 1996

Maurice Barros (IPoD), former department store manager.
Raymond T. Buranello (L)
Robert E. Mattson (NLP)

General election

Predictions

Results

County results

See also 
 2002 United States Senate election

References 

2002
Delaware
2002 Delaware elections
s